The 2019 Sundance Film Festival took place from January 24 to February 3, 2019. The first lineup of competition films was announced on November 28, 2018.

Films

U.S. Dramatic Competition 

 Before You Know It by Hannah Pearl Utt
 Big Time Adolescence by Jason Orley
 Blush by Debra Eisenstadt festival titled Imaginary Order
 Brittany Runs a Marathon by Paul Downs Colaizzo
 Clemency by Chinonye Chukwu
 The Farewell by Lulu Wang
 Hala by Minhal Baig
 Honey Boy by Alma Har'el
 The Last Black Man in San Francisco by Joe Talbot
 Luce by Julius Onah
 Ms. Purple by Justin Chon
 Native Son by Rashid Johnson
 Share by Pippa Bianco
 The Sound of Silence by Michael Tyburski
 Them That Follow by Britt Poulton and Dan Savage
 To the Stars by Martha Stephens

U.S. Documentary Competition 

 Always in Season by Jacqueline Olive
 American Factory by Steven Bognar and Julia Reichert
 Apollo 11 by Todd Douglas Miller
 Bedlam by Kenneth Paul Rosenberg
 David Crosby: Remember My Name by A.J. Eaton
 Hail Satan? by Penny Lane
 Jawline by Liza Mandelup
 Knock Down the House by Rachel Lears
 Midnight Family by Luke Lorentzen
 Mike Wallace Is Here by Avi Belkin
 Moonlight Sonata: Deafness in Three Movements by Irene Taylor Brodsky
 One Child Nation by Nanfu Wang and Jialing Zhang
 Pahokee by Ivete Lucas and Patrick Bresnan
 TIGERLAND by Ross Kauffman
 Untitled Amazing Johnathan Documentary by Ben Berman
 Where’s My Roy Cohn? by Matt Tyrnauer

World Cinema Dramatic Competition 

Dirty God by Sacha Polak
Divine Love by Gabriel Mascaro
Dolce Fine Giornata by Jacek Borcuch
Judy and Punch by Mirrah Foulkes
Koko-di Koko-da by Johannes Nyholm
The Last Tree by Shola Amoo
Monos by Alejandro Landes
Queen of Hearts by May el-Toukhy
The Sharks by Lucía Garibaldi
The Souvenir by Joanna Hogg
This is not Berlin by Hari Sama
We Are Little Zombies by Makoto Nagahisa

World Cinema Documentary Competition 

Advocate by Rachel Leah Jones and Philippe Bellaïche
Cold Case Hammarskjöld by Mads Brügger
The Edge of Democracy by Petra Costa
The Disappearance of My Mother by Beniamino Barrese
Gaza by Garry Keane and Andrew McConnell
Honeyland by Ljubomir Stefanov and Tamara Kotevska
Lapü by Juan Pablo Polanco and César Alejandro Jaimes
The Magic Life of V by Tonislav Hristov
Midnight Traveler by Hassan Fazili
Sea of Shadows by Richard Ladkani
Shooting the Mafia by Kim Longinotto
Stieg Larsson – The Man Who Played With Fire by Henrik Georgsson

Premieres 

 After the Wedding by Bart Freundlich
 Animals by Sophie Hyde
 Blinded by the Light by Gurinder Chadha
 Extremely Wicked, Shockingly Evil and Vile by Joe Berlinger
 Fighting with My Family by Stephen Merchant
 I Am Mother by Grant Sputore
 Late Night by Nisha Ganatra
Mope by Lucas Heyne
Official Secrets by Gavin Hood
Paddleton by Alex Lehmann
Photograph by Ritesh Batra
 Relive by Jacob Aaron Estes
 Sonja - The White Swan by Anne Sewitsky
 The Mustang by Laure de Clermont-Tonnerre
 The Boy Who Harnessed the Wind by Chiwetel Ejiofor
 The Report by Scott Z. Burns
 The Sunlit Night by David Wnendt
 The Tomorrow Man by Noble Jones
 Top End Wedding by Wayne Blair
Troop Zero by Bert & Bertie
Velvet Buzzsaw by Dan Gilroy

Midnight

 Greener Grass by Jocelyn DeBoer & Dawn Luebbe
 Little Monsters by Abe Forsythe
 Memory: The Origins of Alien by Alexandre O. Philippe
 Mope by Lucas Heyne
 Sweetheart by J. D. Dillard
 The Hole in the Ground by Lee Cronin
 The Lodge by Veronika Franz and Severin Fiala

Documentary Premieres 

 Ask Dr. Ruth by Ryan White
 Halston by Frédéric Tcheng
 Love, Antosha by Garret Price
 Marianne & Leonard: Words of Love by Nick Broomfield
 MERATA: How Mum Decolonised The Screen by Heperi Mita
 Miles Davis: Birth of the Cool by Stanley Nelson
 Raise Hell: The Life & Times of Molly Ivins by Janice Engel
 The Brink by Alison Klayman
 The Great Hack by Karim Amer and Jehane Noujaim
 The Inventor: Out for Blood in Silicon Valley by Alex Gibney
 Toni Morrison: The Pieces I Am by Timothy Greenfield-Sanders
 Untouchable by Ursula Macfarlane
 Words from a Bear by Jeffrey Palmer

Special Events 

 Documentary Now! Original Cast Album: Co-Op by Alex Buono
 Documentary Now! Season 52 Preview
 Documentary Now! Waiting for the Artist by Alex Buono and Rhys Thomas
 Leaving Neverland by Dan Reed
 Lorena by Joshua Rofe
 Now Apocalypse by Gregg Araki
 Pop-Up Magazine
 This Is Personal by Amy Berg

Next 
The following 10 films were selected for a world premiere in Next program to highlight the American cinema.

 Adam by Rhys Ernst
 Give Me Liberty by Kirill Mikhanovsky
 Light from Light by Paul Harrill
 Paradise Hills by Alice Waddington
 Premature by Rashaad Ernesto Green
 Selah and the Spades by Tayarisha Poe
 Sister Aimee by Samantha Buck and Marie Schlingmann
 The Death of Dick Long by Daniel Scheinert
 The Infiltrators by Alex Rivera, Cristina Ibarra
 The Wolf Hour by Alistair Banks Griffin

Awards

The winner of the U.S. Grand Jury Prize: Dramatic Award was Clemency (2019), directed by Chinonye Chukwu.

The winner of the U.S. Grand Jury Prize: Documentary Award was One Child Nation (2019), directed by Nanfu Wang and Jialing Zhang.

The winner of the World Cinema Grand Jury Prize: Dramatic was The Souvenir (2019), directed by Joanna Hogg.

The winner of the World Cinema Grand Jury Prize: Documentary was Honeyland (2019), directed by Tamara Kotevska and Ljubomir Stefanov.

The winner of the World Cinema Dramatic Special Jury Award was Monos (2019) directed by Alejandro Landes.

Juries
Jury members, for each program of the festival, including the Alfred P. Sloan Jury were announced on January 17, 2019.

U.S. Documentary Jury
 Lucien Castaing-Taylor
 Yance Ford
 Rachel Grady
 Jeff Orlowski
 Alissa Wilkinson

U.S. Dramatic Jury
 Desiree Akhavan
 Damien Chazelle
 Dennis Lim
 Phyllis Nagy
 Tessa Thompson

World Documentary Jury
 Carl Spence
 Marina Stavenhagen
 Lynette Wallworth

World Dramatic Jury
 Jane Campion
 Charles Gillibert
 Ciro Guerra

World Cinema Documentary Jury
 Maite Alberdi
 Nico Marzano
 Verena Paravel

Alfred P. Sloan Jury
 Mandë Holdford
 Katie Mack
 Sev Ohanian
 Lydia Dean Pilcher
 Corey Stoll

Short Film Jury
 Young Jean Lee
 Carter Smith
 Sheila Vand

Acquisitions 
Sources:

 American Factory: Netflix
 Anthropocene: The Human Epoch: Kino Lorber
 Ask Dr. Ruth: Hulu
 Blinded by the Light: Warner Bros. Pictures/New Line Cinema (US distribution); Entertainment One (UK distribution)
 The Brink: Magnolia Pictures
 Brittany Runs a Marathon: Amazon Studios
 David Crosby: Remember My Name: Sony Pictures Classics
 Delhi Crime Story: Netflix
 The Dispossessed: New York Times Op-Docs
 The Farewell: A24
 Hala: Apple TV+
 Halston: 1091 Media
 Honey Boy: Amazon Studios
 Honeyland: Neon
 Late Night: Amazon Studios
 Lavender: Fox Searchlight Pictures
 Little Monsters: Neon and Hulu
 The Lodge: Neon
 Luce: Neon and Topic Studios
 Marianne & Leonard: Words of Love: Roadside Attractions
 Merata: How Mum Decolonised the Screen: ARRAY
 Monos: Neon
 The Mountain: Kino Lorber
 Native Son: HBO Films
 The Nightingale: IFC Films (US distribution); Transmission Films (Australia distribution)
 Official Secrets: IFC Films
 One Child Nation: Amazon Studios
 Quarter Life Poetry: FX
 The Report: Amazon Studios
 Sea of Shadows: National Geographic Documentary Films
 Share: HBO Films (in association with A24)
 Shooting the Mafia: Cohen Media Group
 The Souvenir: A24
 Them That Follow: 1091 Media
 The Tomorrow Man: Bleecker Street (US distribution); Sony Pictures Worldwide Acquisitions (international distribution)
 Them That Follow: 1091 Media
 Where’s My Roy Cohn?: Sony Pictures Classics
 Wu-Tang Clan: Of Mics and Men: Showtime

References

External links

2019 film festivals
2019 in Utah
2019 Sundance Film Festival